Through the end of the 2021-2022 season in professional football, only thirteen coaches have won 200 career regular season victories. An additional four coaches achieved 200 total wins, but fell short of the milestone in the regular season prior to retiring.

Coaches listed in bold are currently active.

Key

Coaches with 200 regular season wins

Retired coaches with 200 total wins (including post-season)
This list reflects retired coaches that had accomplished 200 total wins, including the post-season, but failed to reach the 200 wins milestone in the regular season prior to retiring. Through the end of the 2022 season, only four former coaches have achieved this.

Other facts
Each coach has won at least one NFL Championship, Grey Cup, or Super Bowl, except Marty Schottenheimer, who had never even appeared in any. Despite not winning any championships in the NFL, Schottenheimer did win the UFL Championship in 2011, coaching the Virginia Destroyers; he also won an AFL Championship (pre-merger) in 1965 as a player with the Buffalo Bills. Schottenheimer also remains the only non-active coach to not be inducted into any Hall of Fames. The only other exceptions are Kurtiss Riggs and Kevin Guy who have only coached indoor American football. Between the Indoor Football League, United Indoor Football (which merged with another league to form the IFL), and National Indoor Football League with the Sioux Falls Storm Riggs has won eleven championships and appeared in fifteen. This includes a six season championship win streak and ten season appearance streak. The Storm achieved a 40 consecutive game wins streak with Riggs as the head coach, including four undefeated seasons. Riggs also had five wins officially fortified from the team's record due to insurance violations in 2009. Since 2021, he has been inducted into the Indoor Football League Hall of Fame while still actively coaching. Kevin Guy has been one of the most prolific coaches in the Indoor Football League, af2, and Arena Football League. As a head coach he has won four league titles, three ArenaBowls and one United Bowl. He also was inducted into the af2 Hall of Fame and was a finalist for the Arena Football Hall of Fame before the league folded.

There have been nine NFL coaches who have won 200 total games, this excludes Bud Grant and Paul Brown due to their total wins included from other professional leagues. The two coaches who have won 200 total games, but not 200 regular season games, are Chuck Noll and Dan Reeves. Noll only coached the Pittsburgh Steelers (1969–1991), winning four Super Bowls and having a prolific Hall of Fame career. He had  193 total wins in the regular season with 209 wins, 156 losses, and one tie overall (.572). In the regular season Reeves had 190 wins; however, in total he had 201 wins, 174 losses, and two ties (.535). Despite not having 200 career regular season wins as a head coach, Reeves coached in four Super Bowls, losing all of them. He did, however, play and coach as an assistant for the Dallas Cowboys, winning two Super Bowls at each position. Along with Marty Schottenheimer, Reeves is the only other coach to have over 200 total wins to have not won a Super Bowl and also not be inducted into the Pro Football Hall of Fame. Reeves remains the only coach with over 200 total wins to have never won a championship in any league as a head coach. Several other NFL coaches had a little less than 190 total wins, but the only coach with more than 189 wins and less than 200 wins is Chuck Knox. Knox had 186 regular season wins with 193 total wins. He coached the Los Angeles Rams (1973–1977), Buffalo Bills (1978–1982), Seattle Seahawks (1983–1991), and Los Angeles Rams (1992–1994) again, with no Super Bowl appearances or Hall of Fame nomination despite three AP NFL Coach of the Year Awards.

Bud Grant and Marv Levy are the only coaches to lead teams to both the Grey Cup Finals and the Super Bowl, both have been inducted into the Pro Football Hall of Fame and Canadian Football Hall of Fame. They both lost four Super Bowls, individually, while winning several Grey Cups. Between the NFL, CFL, and USFL, Levy had over 200 professional wins, resulting in 209–167–4 overall. He recorded 191–156–4 in the regular season, coaching the Montreal Alouettes (1973–1977), Kansas City Chiefs (1978–1982), Chicago Blitz (1984), and the Buffalo Bills (1986–1997).

Tim Marcum is the winningest and most successful coach in Arena Football League history. During the regular season, Marcum resulted in a 184–87 (.679) record and 28–12 (.700) in the post-season, which totals to 212–99 (.682) overall. He coached the Denver Dynamite (1987), Detroit Drive (1988–1989, 1991–1993), and the Tampa Bay Storm (1995–2010). Marcum has been inducted into the Arena Football Hall of Fame. During his time as a head coach, Marcum coached in eleven ArenaBowls, winning seven of them. Other AFL coaches who came close to 200 wins were Darren Arbet with 188 overall wins (169 regular season wins) and Mike Hohensee with 170 overall wins (158 regular season wins), both are also in the AFL Hall of Fame. While Marcum had more AFL wins, Kevin Guy has built his coaching legacy through other prominent indoor football leagues, such as the af2 and IFL. Guy only had 105 AFL wins.

See also
 List of National Football League head coach wins leaders
 List of Canadian Football League head coaches by wins

References

American football-related lists